This is a list of the Sounds of Scotland. There are numerous other stretches of open water around the Scottish coasts that could be classified as straits, but which are called by names other than "Sound".

Shetland
Balta Sound on the island of Unst
Bluemull Sound between Unst and Yell
 Colgrave Sound between Fetlar and Yell
Easter Sound between Vaila and Whitesness on the West Mainland
Sound of Papa between Papa Stour and West Mainland
Uyea Sound between Uyea and Unst
Vaila Sound separating Vaila from Linga and the bays of Walls 
Wester Sound between Vaila and Burrastow on the West Mainland
 Yell Sound between Yell and Mainland Shetland

Orkney
Auskerry Sound between Stronsay and Auskerry
Burra Sound between Hoy and Graemsay
Clestrain Sound between Mainland Orkney and Graemsay
Eynhallow Sound separating Rousay from Mainland Orkney
Gairsay Sound between Gairsay and Wyre
Gutter Sound between Rysa Little and Fara
Holm Sound between Burray, Lamb Holm and Mainland Orkney
Hoy Sound between Hoy and Mainland Orkney
Linga Sound between Linga Holm and Stronsay
Sanday Sound, between Sanday and Stronsay
Shapinsay Sound between Shapinsay and Mainland Orkney
Sound of Hoxa between South Ronaldsay and Flotta
Switha Sound between Switha and Flotta
The North Sound between Westray and Sanday
Water Sound between Burray and South Ronaldsay
Weddell Sound between Fara and Flotta
Wyre Sound, between Wyre and Rousay

Inner Hebrides
Clachan Sound between Seil and mainland Argyll.
Cuan Sound between Seil and Luing
Cuillin Sound between Rùm and Skye
Inner Sound between Raasay and the Applecross peninsula
Shuna Sound between Luing and Shuna
Sound of Arisaig between mainland Lochaber the Small Isles
Sound of Canna between Rùm and Canna
Sound of Gigha between Gigha and Kintyre
Sound of Islay between Islay and Jura
Sound of Iona between Iona and Mull
Sound of Jura between Jura and Knapdale
Sound of Luing between Luing and Lunga
Sound of Mull between Mull and Morvern
Sound of Raasay between Raasay and Skye
Sound of Rum between Rùm and Eigg
Sound of Sleat between Sleat and Knoydart

Outer Hebrides

Sound of Barra between Barra and South Uist
Sound of Berneray between Barra Head and Mingulay
Sound of Harris between Harris and North Uist
Sound of Shiant between Lewis and the Shiant Islands
Sound of Sandray between Sandray and Vatersay
Soay Sound between Soay Mòr and Harris

Firth of Clyde
Kilbrannan Sound between Kintyre and Arran
Sound of Bute between Bute and Arran

See also
Firths of Scotland - substantial estuaries.
List of sea lochs in Scotland
:Category:Scottish coast
Western Ferries who operate a number of vessels named Sound of.... after some of the above locations.

Notes

References
Murray, W.H. (1977) The Companion Guide to the West Highlands of Scotland. London. Collins.
"Get-a-Map" Ordnance Survey Retrieved 4 January 2009.